Fauquier  is a county in the Commonwealth of Virginia. As of the 2020 census, the population was 72,972. The county seat is Warrenton.

Fauquier County is in Northern Virginia and is a part of the Washington metropolitan area.

History

In 1608, the first European to explore in the vicinity, Captain John Smith, reported that the Whonkentia (a subgroup of the Siouan-speaking Manahoac tribe) inhabited the area. The Manahoac were forced out around 1670 by the Iroquois (Seneca), who did not resettle the area. The Conoy camped briefly near The Plains, from 1697 to 1699. The Six Nations ceded the entire region including modern Fauquier to Virginia Colony at the Treaty of Albany, in 1722.

Fauquier County was established on May 1, 1759, from Prince William County. It is named for Francis Fauquier, Lieutenant Governor of Virginia at the time, who won the land in a poker game, according to legend.

American Civil War battles in Fauquier County included (in order) the First Battle of Rappahannock Station, the Battle of Thoroughfare Gap, the Battle of Kelly's Ford, the Battle of Aldie, the Battle of Middleburg, the Battle of Upperville, the First and Second Battle of Auburn, the Battle of Buckland Mills, and the Second Battle of Rappahannock Station.

Geography

Fauquier county is not densely populated, but exurban development from Washington, DC has sprung up in some parts. Even in rural areas, housing complexes can be seen along highways. The highest point by elevation is Blue Mountain at 2205 ft (602 meters) on the county's northwestern border with Warren County.

Adjacent counties
 Clarke County (north)
 Loudoun County (north)
 Prince William County (east)
 Stafford County (southeast)
 Culpeper County (southwest)
 Rappahannock County (west)
 Warren County (northwest)

Major highways

Demographics

2020 census

Note: the US Census treats Hispanic/Latino as an ethnic category. This table excludes Latinos from the racial categories and assigns them to a separate category. Hispanics/Latinos can be of any race.

2000 Census
In 2000 there were 19,842 households, out of which 36.10% had children under the age of 18 living with them, 63.80% were married couples living together, 8.60% had a female householder with no husband present, and 23.70% were non-families. 18.70% of all households were made up of individuals, and 6.20% had someone living alone who was 65 years of age or older. The average household size was 2.75 and the average family size was 3.14.

As of 2013, the population was spread out, with 24.2% under the age of 18, 6.40% from 18 to 24, 30.30% from 25 to 44, 26.00% from 45 to 64, and 14.4% who were 65 years of age or older. The median age was 38 years. For every 100 females, there were 98.8 males. For every 100 females age 18 and over, there were 95.4 males.

The median income for a household in the county was $93,762. The per capita income for the county was $39,600. About 3.70% of families and 5.60% of the population were below the poverty line, including 4.70% of those under age 18 and 8.70% of those age 65 or over.

The county is exurban. There has been increased growth in Warrenton and New Baltimore in recent years. The subdivisions of Brookside and Vint Hill have facilitated the growth in the eastern part of the county. There is some industry in Fauquier County, however the largest employer in the county is the county government and the hospital. As of the 2000 census, 47% of county residents that work have jobs that are outside the county. The average travel time to work is 39.2 minutes.

Government

Board of Supervisors
 Cedar Run District: Richard Gerhardt (R) – Chairman
 Center District: Kevin T. Carter
 Lee District: Christopher Butler (R) - Vice Chairman
 Marshall District: Mary Leigh McDaniel (I)
 Scott District: R. Holder Trumbo Jr. (R)

Constitutional officers
 Clerk of the Circuit Court: Gail H. Barb (R)
 Commissioner of the Revenue: Eric Maybach (R)
 Commonwealth's Attorney: James P. Fisher (R)
 Sheriff: Jeremy A. Falls (R)
 Treasurer: Tanya Remson Wilcox (R)

Legislators
The Virginia Senate:
 Jill Holtzman Vogel (R)
The Virginia House of Delegates:
 Michael J. Webert (R)
 Elizabeth R. Guzmán (D)
 Phillip Scott (R)
The U.S. House of Representatives:
 Jennifer Wexton (D)

Law enforcement
The Fauquier County Sheriff's Office is the primary law enforcement agency in Fauquier County, Virginia. Its headquarters are in Warrenton. It supports the Warrenton Training Center, a CIA site in Warrenton.

Warrenton and Remington have their own police departments.

Politics

Education

Elementary schools
 C. M. Bradley Elementary School
 James G. Brumfield Elementary School
 W. G. Coleman Elementary School
 Grace Miller Elementary School
 H. M. Pearson Elementary School
 C. Hunter Ritchie Elementary School
 P. B. Smith Elementary School
 Claude Thompson Elementary School
 Mary Walter Elementary School
 Greenville Elementary School
 M. M. Pierce Elementary School

Middle schools
 Auburn Middle School
 Cedar Lee Middle School
 W. C. Taylor Middle School
 Marshall Middle School
 Warrenton Middle School

High schools
 Fauquier High School
 Liberty High School
 Southeastern Alternative School
 Kettle Run High School
 Mountain Vista Governor's School

Private schools
 Fresta Valley Christian School
 Highland School
St. John The Evangelist Catholic School
 Wakefield School

Higher education
 Laurel Ridge Community College
 Thorpe House Adult Learning Center

Communities

Towns
 Remington
 The Plains
 Warrenton (county seat)

Census-designated places

 Bealeton
 Calverton
 Catlett
 Marshall
 Midland
 New Baltimore
 Opal

Other unincorporated communities

 Airlie
 Atoka
 Belle Meade
 Belvoir
 Bleak
 Bristersburg
 Broad Run
 Casanova
 Delaplane
 Elk Run
 Germantown
 Goldvein
 Halfway
 Hume
 Liberty
 Linden
 Markham
 Morrisville
 Old Tavern
 Orlean
 Paris
 Rectortown
 Somerville
 Sumerduck
 Upperville

Notable people
James Markham Ambler, American naval surgeon
 Turner Ashby, born in Fauquier County, Confederate Army colonel in the American Civil War.
 Martin Berkofsky, classical pianist and philanthropist.
 Irv Cross, American footballer and sportscaster.
 Susan Cummings, an heiress infamous for killing Argentine polo player Roberto Villegas.
 Robert Duvall, American-born actor who maintains a farm in The Plains.
 Bertram and Diana Firestone, owners of Newstead Farm.
 George B. Fitch, American businessman, Mayor of Warrenton, founder of Jamaican Bobsled Team.
 Rear Admiral Cary Travers Grayson, owner of historic Blue Ridge Farm.
 Eppa Hunton, U.S. Representative and Senator from Virginia, born and lived in Warrenton.
 Charles Marshall, born in Warrenton, assistant adjutant general, aide de camp and military secretary to Gen. Robert E. Lee. Grandnephew of Chief Justice John Marshall.
 James K. Marshall, Colonel in the Confederate States Army, killed in action during Pickett's Charge at the Battle of Gettysburg while leading the brigade of J. Johnston Pettigrew, grandson of Chief Justice John Marshall.
 John Marshall, born in Fauquier County, Chief Justice of the United States.
 Paul Mellon, philanthropist, an Exemplar of Racing and owner of Rokeby Farm.
 John S. Mosby, lived in Warrenton, was a Confederate partisan ranger and cavalryman during the American Civil War. Buried in Warrenton cemetery.
 Karen O'Connor and David O'Connor, Olympic eventing riders
 Albert Rust, 19th-century American politician who served as a senior officer of the Confederate States Army during the American Civil War (1861–1865).
 Michaele Salahi and Tareq Salahi, the White House Gate Crashers.
 Willard Scott, an American media personality best known for his work on NBC's The Today Show who lived in Paris, Virginia.
 Scott Shipp, born in Warrenton, Superintendent of Virginia Military Institute from 1890 to 1907.
 Isabel Dodge Sloane, owner of Brookmeade Stud.
 William "Extra Billy" Smith, died in Warrenton, was a lawyer, congressman, two time Governor of Virginia and one of the oldest Confederate generals in the American Civil War.
 Shedrick Thompson, disputed lynching victim
 Liz Whitney Tippett, owner of the Llangollen estate.

See also
 Fauquier County Sheriff's Office
 National Register of Historic Places listings in Fauquier County, Virginia
 Timeline of Fauquier County, Virginia in the Civil War
 Fauquier, British Columbia

References

External links

 Fauquier County Government Site

 
Virginia counties
Northern Virginia counties
Washington metropolitan area
1759 establishments in Virginia